The Porcelain Fat Lady is a children's story by the Chilean writer Isabel Allende.

Style
The story is told by a firstly unknown person. The person itself knows the story so perfectly and detailed since the protagonist himself told it her once.

Plot
The story deals with Don Cornelio, who in the beginning lives a boring and monotonous life as a typist in a notary agency. He never gets too late, always leaves his house at the same time. He always takes the same green line bus, day in, day out. 7 days a week. But one day his life changes - the day when he sees La gorda de porcelana standing barely dressed in a store window and decides to buy her (also named Fantasía). She fascinates him from the very first moment, winks at him, and so he is prepared to pay an entire month's salary for her. From this day on (which is point-of-no-return in the story), his life changes. Since he is not allowed to bring Fantasía into his flat, he tries to hide her at work. At work their friendship begins. Don Cornelio opens the window, since this is what the vivid Fantasía is asking for, and Fantasía takes him out for a flight. For Fantasía Don Cornelio gives up his job after 20 years of loyal work, and starts a whole new life. He conquers his shyness, talks to all the people in the park he has seen all the years before during his breaks and becomes a colourfully dressed and very happy ice cream and chestnut seller.

Inspiration for the story
The story might be an allegory of the Pinochet regime in Chile. At the same time, the story was written when Isabel Allende got a divorce from her first husband in 1973, which may have inspired the monotonous life of protagonist Don Cornelio (like that of Allende while she was married).

References

Novels by Isabel Allende
1984 children's books